Cirrhochrista nivea is a moth in the family Crambidae. It was described by Joseph de Joannis in 1932. It is found on Mauritius.

References

Moths described in 1932
Spilomelinae
Moths of Africa